The Slovakia national under-19 football team, controlled by the Slovak Football Association, is Slovakia's national under 19 football team and is considered to be a feeder team for the Slovakia under-21 team.

UEFA European Under-19 Championship

Fixtures and results
Below shows the results of all international matches of this team played within the last 12 months, as well as any future matches that have been scheduled.

2021

2022

Current squad
 The following players were called up for the friendly matches.
 Match dates: 16 and 18 November 2022
 Opposition: 
 Caps and goals correct as of:''' 27 September 2022, after the match against

See also
Slovakia national football team
Slovakia national under-21 football team
Slovakia national under-18 football team
Slovakia national under-17 football team
Slovakia national under-16 football team
Slovakia national under-15 football team

References

External links
 Slovak Football Association 
  

European national under-19 association football teams
under-19